Gymnadenia conopsea, commonly known as the fragrant orchid or chalk fragrant orchid, is a herbaceous plant of the family Orchidaceae native to northern Europe.

Etymology 
The specific Latin name "conopsea" derives from the Greek , literally meaning "mosquito-like", probably because of the similarity of the long spur of the flower with the mouthparts of a mosquito.

The scientific binomial name of this plant was initially Orchis conopsea, proposed by the Swedish naturalist and botanist Carl von Linné (1707–1778) in his  of 1753. The name has been subsequently amended to the one currently accepted (Gymnadenia conopsea), by the British botanist Robert Brown (1773–1858) in 1813.

Description 

These plants are tuberous geophytes, as they bring their buds in underground tuber, organs that annually produce new stems, leaves and flowers. These orchids are "terrestrial"  because unlike "epiphytic" species, they do not grow on other plants of major sizes.

The stem is leafy and robust, with a striated surface. The leaves are long, narrow and lanceolate and vary from 3 to 7. The leaf color is gray-green. Size of leaf: width 1 to 2 cm, length 10 – 25 cm.

These orchids have two ovoidal bulbs, deeply webbed and with many small and short lobes. Size of tubers: 1 to 3.5 cm.

These inflorescences are scented and genes underlying eugenol (a volatile scent compound) production have been identified in Gymnadenia conopsea, G. odoratissima and G. densiflora. The flowers are petiolated, placed in the axils of long bracts and reach on average . They have a distinctive three lobed lip and long spurs. Their light scent is similar to cloves. Their colors vary from white and pink to pink-purple, more rarely white. These flowers bloom in the Summer, from June to July. They are hermaphrodite and pollinated by insects (entomophily), including moths.

Ecology 
The species is almost exclusively pollinated by moths (Lepidoptera). The most common pollinators are the small elephant hawk-moth (Deilephila porcellus), hummingbird hawk-moth (Macroglossum stellatarum), silver Y (Autographa gamma), burnished brass (Diachrysia chrysitis) and large yellow underwing (Noctua pronuba). Fruit set is high with an average of 73%.

The seed's germination is conditioned by the presence of mycorrhizal fungi. Gymnadenia conopsea is held to be a mycorrhizal generalist, able to form associations with a variety of different fungal species including species in the Tulasnellaceae, Ceratobasidiaceae and Pezizales.

Distribution 
This plant is quite common throughout northern Europe with the exception of the Dinaric Alps. In Asia it is common in areas to the north of the Himalayas.
Gymnadenia conopsea ssp. borealis  has been recorded from Co. Donegal, Ireland in 2004.

Habitat 
This species' habitat includes mountain meadows and pastures, grassland and fens.

Subspecies 
 Gymnadenia conopsea subsp. conopsea
 Gymnadenia conopsea subsp. montana Bisse

Synonyms 

 Gymnadenia alpina (Turcz. ex Rchb.f.) Czerep. 1981
 Gymnadenia anisoloba Peterm. 1849
 Gymnadenia comigera Rchb. 1830
 Gymnadenia gracillima Schur 1871
 Gymnadenia ibukiensis Makino 1912
 Gymnadenia orchidis var. pantlingii Renz 2001
 Gymnadenia ornithis Rich. 1818
 Gymnadenia psuedoconopsea Gren. Rouy 1912
 Gymnadenia pyrenaica Giraudias 1882
 Gymnadenia sibirica Turcz. ex Lindl. 1835
 Gymnadenia splendida Dworschak 2002
 Gymnadenia splendida subsp. odorata Dworschak 2002
 Gymnadenia transsilvanica Schur 1866
 Gymnadenia vernalis Dworschak 2002
 Gymnadenia wahlenbergii Afzel. ex Rchb.f. 1851
 Habenaria conopsea (L.) Benth. (1880)
 Habenaria gymnadenia Druce 1897
 Orchis conopea Gras 1862
 Orchis conopsea L. 1753
 Orchis cornopica Mill. 1768
 Orchis ornithis Jacq. 1774
 Orchis peloria Foucault ex Poir. 1816
 Orchis pseudoconopea Gren. 1869
 Orchis pseudo-conopsea Gren. 1865
 Orchis pseudoconopsea J.Parm. 1894
 Orchis setacea Gilib. 1792
 Orchis suaveolens Salisb. 1796
 Satyrium conopseum (L.) Wahlenb. 1826

References 

 Pignatti S. - Flora d'Italia (3 voll.) - Edagricole – 1982, Vol. III
 Tutin, T.G. et al. - Flora Europaea, second edition - 1993
 CLAESSENS, J. & J. KLEYNEN (2011): The flower of the European Orchid – Form and function

External links 
 
 
 Biolib
  Gymnadenia conopsea
 Archive

conopsea
Orchids of Europe
Orchids of Asia
Plants described in 1753
Taxa named by Carl Linnaeus